The Arnold Cipher was a book cipher used by John André and Benedict Arnold during the negotiations that led to Arnold's failed attempt to surrender West Point to the British in 1780.

Background
In May 1779, Continental Army Major General Benedict Arnold initiated what became a series of communications with British Army Major John André, the adjutant and spy chief to Lieutenant General Sir Henry Clinton, the commander-in-chief of British forces in North America.  In these communications, which were at first mediated by Joseph Stansbury, a Philadelphia merchant, Arnold offered his services to the British.  André responded to this offer with a letter dated May 10, 1779, in which he described the types of services Arnold might provide, and described a code which they should use to obscure their communications.

The book used as a key to the cipher was either Commentaries on the Laws of England by William Blackstone or Nathan Bailey's Dictionary.  The cipher consisted of a series of three numbers separated by periods.  These numbers represented a page number of the agreed book, a line number on that page, and a word number in that line.  Arnold added missing letters or suffixes where he could not find a match in one of the books.  For example, 120.9.7 would refer to the 120th page, the 9th line on that page, and the seventh word in that line, which, in the following example is decoded as "general".

The actual communications were often disguised by embedding it in a letter written by Arnold's wife Peggy, where the cipher would be written in invisible ink, but might also have been disguised as what appeared to be routine business communications.

Coded example
This code was generated by Arnold for a message to André dated July 12, 1780:

Decoded example
Here is how Jonathan Odell, André's assistant, decoded the message:

References

 
 
 
 

Classical ciphers
Benedict Arnold